Jillian Kimberley "Jill" Lim (born 1990) is a radio presenter from Singapore. She was a DJ on Kiss 92FM morning show but had since been removed from the show and took up a new role in marketing as she announced on Instagram.  She has since returned to presenting on Sunday mornings on Kiss92 as of February 2023.  Prior to her current role, she was previously a presenter on One FM 91.3.

Biography 
Lim is of mixed ethnicity, with Eurasian and Chinese ancestry.

In 2009, while studying at Republic Polytechnic, Lim joined Hot FM 91.3's morning show, 'The Married Men', alongside DJs Rod Monteiro and Andre Hoeden. When 'The Married Men' show ended in 2013, Jill continued as a DJ at Hot FM (which was renamed One FM 91.3 in 2015), presenting her own shows and also co-presenting the evening show with Joshua Simon from 2015 to 2016.

In 2017, Lim moved to One FM's sister station, Kiss 92FM.

References

1990 births
Living people
Singaporean radio presenters
Singaporean women radio presenters